His Lost Love is a 1909 American silent short drama film directed by D. W. Griffith. A print of the film exists in the film archive of the Library of Congress.

Cast
James Kirkwood as Luke
Owen Moore as James
Mary Pickford as Mary
George Nichols as Mary's Father
Kate Bruce as Maid
Gladys Egan as wedding guest
Frank Evans as wedding guest
Marion Leonard as the sister / wedding guest
Violet Mersereau as wedding guest
Anthony O'Sullivan as wedding guest
Lottie Pickford as wedding guest
Gertrude Robinson as A Grown Child

References

External links
 

1909 drama films
1909 films
Silent American drama films
American silent short films
American black-and-white films
Films directed by D. W. Griffith
1909 short films
1900s American films